Jacks may refer to:

 Knucklebones, a game of ancient origin, also known as "jacks" 
 Jacks (band), a 1960s Japanese psychedelic rock band
 Jacks Mountain, a ridge in Pennsylvania, United States
 Jacks River, a river in the Cohutta Wilderness Area, Georgia, United States
 Jack's, a fast food restaurant chain in the United States
 Jack's, a value retail chain in the United Kingdom, part of the Tesco Group
 South Dakota State Jackrabbits, the athletic program of South Dakota State University

People with the surname
 Al Jacks (born c. 1935), American professor and college football coach
 Banita Jacks, American convicted murderer
 Brian Jacks (born 1946), British judoka
 Digby Jacks (1945–2011), British trade union official 
 George Jacks (born 1946), English association football player
 Harry Jacks (1908–1994), New Zealand soldier, plant pathologist, lecturer and forester
 James Jacks (1947–2014), American film producer 
 Katrina Jacks (1986–2010), Welsh rower and chemical engineer
 L. P. Jacks (1860–1955), English educator, philosopher, and Unitarian minister
 Onimim Jacks, Nigerian lawyer
 Robert Jacks (born 1943), Australian painter, sculptor and printmaker
 Ron Jacks (born 1948), Canadian swimmer
 Sam Jacks (1915–1975), Canadian sports inventor
 Susan Jacks (1948–2022), Canadian singer–songwriter
 Terry Jacks (born 1944), Canadian singer, songwriter, record producer and environmentalist
 Tex Jacks (born 1995), British actor
 Tyler Jacks, American biologist
 William Jacks (1841–1907), British ironmaster, author, and politician

See also
 
 
 Jack (disambiguation)
 Jax (disambiguation)